Kartashovka , rural localities in Russia, may refer to:

 Kartashovka, Cheremisinovsky District, Kursk Oblast, a village
 Kartashovka, Medvensky District, Kursk Oblast, a khutor
 Kartashovka, Shchigrovsky District, Kursk Oblast, a village
 Kartashovka, Lipetsk Oblast, a village
 Kartashovka, Oryol Oblast, a village